The PowerShot products is a line of consumer and prosumer grade digital cameras, launched by Canon in 1996. In 1996 a model of  PowerShot was introduced to the market, The Powershot 600. The production of The PowerShort came shortly after Canon released and subsequently discounted its SV series in 1992 and switched to digital cameras. The PowerShot line has been successful for Canon, and is one of the best-selling digital camera lines worldwide. The Powershot's success comes its marketing to the general public as a compact and easy to use digital camera.

Free software from the Canon Hack Development Kit (CHDK) project allows nearly complete programmatic control of PowerShot cameras, enabling users to add features, up to and including BASIC and Lua scripting.

Some models of PowerShot cameras were affected by third-party CCD sensors with a design flaw, which caused them to fail and display severely distorted images. Canon offered to repair affected cameras free of charge.

Products

Current
D series: waterproof, freeze-resistant, and shock-resistant
E series: design-oriented budget cameras
G series: flagship cameras with advanced features
S/SD series (also known as PowerShot Digital ELPH, Digital IXUS, and IXY Digital): "Performance and Style" ultra-compact point-and-shoot cameras
S/SX series: ultra-zoom cameras
("IS" and "HS" are not a series; they are suffixes that denote "image stabilization" and "high sensitivity".)

Discontinued
S series: originally a series of compact point-and-shoot cameras, currently a series of prosumer cameras slotting beneath the G series
A series: "Easy and Fun" budget cameras ranging from point-and-shoot to prosumer cameras
PowerShot 600 (1996)
Pro series: semi-professional-level cameras slotting right beneath Canon's dSLRs, consisting of the Pro70 (1998), Pro90 IS (2001), and Pro1 (2004)
TX series: hybrid camera–camcorders

See also
List of Canon products

References

External links

 
Products introduced in 1996